U Select is a chain of supermarkets in Hong Kong operated by China Resources Vanguard, originally in partnership with Tesco. At least one third of the products sold in the store come from overseas supermarket chains. As part of Tesco's decision to cease international product sales due to Brexit, U Select instead started stocking Coles products from December 2021, and also begun stocking Morrisons products from May 2022.

Features 
 Around one third of products sold in the store are from Coles or Morrisons, formerly Tesco or its international operations (including Lotus's and Homeplus until their sale).
 Shelf edge labelling indicating the origin of the goods.
 Pricing of goods is slightly different compared to sister chain Vanguard.

History 
On 18 August 2013, China Resources Enterprise's supermarket chain Vanguard and British supermarket Tesco signed a "memorandum of understanding", intending to set up a joint venture interest group in mainland China, Hong Kong and Macau, operating hypermarkets, supermarkets, convenience stores, liquor stores and cash and carry businesses. China Resources and Tesco are holding an 80% and a 20% share respectively.

In April 2015, China Resources opened the first U Select supermarkets, with the first two stores opening on 18 April 2015 in Prince Edward Road West and Bellagio Mall.

In June 2015, the third branch opened on Main Street East, Shau Kei Wan.

On 17 September 2015, the tenth branch (the second outlet in Kowloon) opened at Hip Wo Street in Cheung Wo Court, Kwun Tong.

As of May 2018, there were 37 stores.

As of February 2021, there are 67 stores.

As of July 2021, there are 75 stores.

Store types

U Select 
The original branches of U Select have a blue colour scheme and were originally intended to be a value chain, previously only taking cash and not credit/debit cards.

U Select Food 
In June 2019, the first U Select Food was opened in South Horizons, with others opening since. U Select Food outlets have more foreign products (especially food), less non-food products, and use a black colour scheme.

U Select Mini 
On 22 April 2021, the first U Select Mini opened on King's Road, a converted VanGO convenience store from the same family. There are currently two U Select Mini outlets, both located on Hong Kong Island.

Locations
All the original locations were converted from Vanguard supermarkets with other locations added later:

Hong Kong Island 
  26 stores

Kowloon 
 28 stores

New Territories 
 21 stores

External links 

 
Video promoting U Select's worldwide Tesco product selection

References 

China Resources
Convenience stores
Government-owned companies of China
Supermarkets of Hong Kong